Shooting Australia is the governing body for shooting sports in Australia. The company is registered as Australian International Shooting Limited, but trades under the Shooting Australia brand.

About
Shooting Australia is the peak body responsible for the growth, sustainability, and success of target shooting sports in Australia. It represents Australian shooters internationally via the International Shooting Sport Federation; Commonwealth Shooting Federation and International Metallic Silhouette Shooting Union.

Shooting Australia is recognised domestically by the Australian Sports Commission; Australian Olympic Committee; Australian Paralympic Committee; and the Australian Commonwealth Games Association as the National Sporting Organisation for target shooting sports.

Shooting Australia's objectives are to promote and coordinate responsible shooting sports, both competitive and recreational, within Australia; and to promote and coordinate participation in, and organisation of international competitions mindful of providing sustainable international success.

Target shooting is a sport which features on the program of both the Commonwealth Games and the Olympic Games.

Structure
SA is a company limited by guarantee comprising five full member organisations:
 Australian Clay Target Association
 Sporting Clays Australia
 National Rifle Association of Australia
 Pistol Australia
 Target Rifle Australia

and an associate member:
 NSW Shooting Association

References

External links
 
 
 
 

Australia
Shooting sports in Australia
Sports governing bodies in Australia